The 2019 Colonial Square Ladies Classic was held from September 27 to 30 at the Nutana Curling Club in Saskatoon, Saskatchewan as part of the World Curling Tour. The event was held in a triple-knockout format with a purse of $30,000.

In the final, Rachel Homan of Ontario defeated Tracy Fleury of Manitoba to win her first tour event of the 2019–20 season. It was a third straight appearance in a final for Fleury, having won the 2019 Cargill Curling Training Centre Icebreaker and finishing runner-up at the 2019 AMJ Campbell Shorty Jenkins Classic.

Teams
The teams are listed as follows:

Knockout brackets

Source:

A event

B event

C event

Knockout results
All draw times listed in Central Standard Time.

Draw 1
Friday, September 27, 3:00 pm

Draw 2
Friday, September 27, 9:15 pm

Draw 3
Saturday, September 28, 11:00 am

Draw 4
Saturday, September 28, 3:00 pm

Draw 5
Saturday, September 28, 7:00 pm

Draw 6
Sunday, September 29, 10:00 am

Draw 7
Sunday, September 29, 2:00 pm

Draw 8
Sunday, September 29, 6:00 pm

Playoffs
Source:

Quarterfinals
Monday, September 30, 9:00 am

Semifinals
Monday, September 30, 12:00 pm

Final
Monday, September 30, 3:00 pm

References

External links
CurlingZone

Colonial Square Ladies Classic
Colonial Square
Colonial Square Ladies Classic
Curling in Saskatoon
Colonial Square Ladies Classic